Shao Shiping (1900–1965) was a Chinese politician. He was born in Yiyang County, Jiangxi Province in the People's Republic of China.

He joined the Communist Youth League of China and the Communist Party of China in 1925. In January 1928, along with Fang Zhimin and Huang Dao, he organized an uprising in Hengfeng County, Jiangxi Province. During the Second Sino-Japanese War, he was active in the border region of Shanxi, Chahar Province and Hebei.

He went to Northeast China after the end of the war against Japan, where he organized Communist Party groups in Liaoning and Jilin Provinces. With the creation of the People's Republic, he returned to his home province as its 1st governor.

1900 births
1965 deaths
People's Republic of China politicians from Jiangxi
Chinese Communist Party politicians from Jiangxi
Governors of Jiangxi
Politicians from Shangrao